National Innovation Council is the think-tank council of India to discuss, analyse and help implement strategies for innovation in India and suggest a Roadmap for Innovation 2010-2020. It is currently headed by no one as its incumbent chairman Sam Pitroda has resigned. It has approved Vadodara Innovation Council as its first city-based innovation council in India.

See also
 Ideawicket
 Indovation
 National Innovation Foundation
 Vadodara Innovation Council

References

Business organisations based in India
Innovation
Innovation organizations
Innovation in India